Densey Clyne (born Dorothy Denise Bell, 4 December 1922 – 21 May 2019) was an Australian naturalist, photographer, writer, and documentarian. She is especially well known for her studies of spiders and insects.

Life
Clyne was born in Risca, Wales, United Kingdom, and moved to Australia in 1936. During World War II she served as a commissioned officer in the Australian Women's Army Service, after a year in the Land Army. She married Peter Clyne (1927–1987) in 1950. At the time she died, Clyne lived in Wauchope, New South Wales.

Achievements 
As a naturalist, conservationist, and communicator, Clyne wrote 30 books on natural history and environmental subjects, particularly on insects and spiders. She wrote scripts for her own and other television documentaries on natural history, maintaining a partnership with filmmaker Jim Frazier. Clyne published numerous papers and articles dealing with invertebrate lives and behaviour in professional journals and popular magazines. She delivered talks and addresses on invertebrate behaviour and the pleasures of insect-watching to schools, adult groups, and professional organisations. She took part in seminars on natural history writing and on wildlife filming, and also acted as a consultant on local wildlife for Australian and overseas television film productions, including several by the BBC Natural History Unit. She also served as a juror at Japan's Environmental Film Festival (1995), and presented regular natural history segments for eight years on Channel 9's Burke's Backyard lifestyle show. Densey Clyne was a Fellow of the Royal Entomological Society of London.
For her contributions to arachnology, Clyne had two new species of spider named for her.

Print media 
Clyne wrote several regularly-printed columns on natural history for:
 Australian Wildlife Magazine
 The Sydney Morning Herald
 This Australia
 Australian Natural History (Nature Australia)
 The Australian Women's Weekly
 Burke's Backyard Magazine
 Gardens and Outdoor Living

Scientific papers 
Clyne's scientific contributions included the first detailed description of the net-making behaviour and sperm induction of the spider Dinopis subrufa, (Australian Zoologist, 1967); the web structure of the spider Poecilopachys bispinosa (Journal of the Australian Entomological Society, 1973); and a joint paper with D. Rentz, CSIRO Insect Division, on Anthophiloptera dryas, a new orthopteran genus and species, studied and recorded over several years by Clyne in her Sydney garden (Journal of the Australian Entomological Society, 1983).

Awards 
 Hasselblad Masters Award, 1976
 C. J. Dennis Nat. Hist. Lit. Award, 1982, "Wildlife in the Suburbs"
 C. J. Dennis Nat. Hist. Lit. Award, 1989, "Garden Jungle"
 Roy. Zool. Soc. NSW, Whitley Awards 1982, Best Children's Series, "Nature City"
 Roy. Zool. Soc. NSW, Whitley Awards, Commendation, "Garden Jungle"
 Roy. Zool. Soc. NSW, Whitley Awards 1993, Best Children's Series, "Small Worlds"
 Roy. Zool. Soc. NSW, Whitley Commendation, Best Children's Series, "Small Worlds"
 Wilderness Society's Environmental Award 1996, "Small Worlds"
 TV Society of Australia, Individual Achievement Award 1977, Best Documentary Director
 National Geographic Society, Earthwatch award 1995, "Webs of Intrigue" (film)
Australian Geographic Society, Award for Excellence 1996
 Australian Geographic Society, Photographer of the Year Award 1999
 Roy. Zool. Soc.NSW Whitley Awards 2010 Best Children's Series '"All About Ants" and "Secret Life of Butterflies"

Publications 
Books authored or co-authored by Clyne include:
 1969 – A Guide to Australian Spiders. Their Collection and Identification. Thomas Nelson & Sons.
 1969 – Australian Frogs. Periwinkle Books: Melbourne.
 1970 – Australian Ground Orchids. Periwinkle Books: Melbourne.
 1972 – Australian Rock and Tree Orchids. Periwinkle Books: Melbourne.
 1973 – Wildflowers of New South Wales. Rigby Australia.
 1973 – Wildflowers of the Outback. Rigby: Adelaide.
 1973 – Australian Insect Wonders. (With Harry Frauca).
 1976 – Australian Wildflowers. International Limited. (With Esther Stepnell and Marian Beek).
 1978 – How to Keep Insects as Pets. Angus & Robertson.
 1979 – The Garden Jungle. Collins: Sydney.
 1979 – Rainforest. A Journey into Nature's Richest Garden (with Jim Frazier).
 1982 – "Night Animals" Methuen
 1982 – "Birds" Methuen
 1982 – "Frogs and Lizards" Methuen
 1984 – Wildlife in the Suburbs. OUP: Melbourne.
 1984 – More Wildlife in the Suburbs. Angus & Robertson: Sydney.
 1984 – Silkworms. Angus & Robertson.
 1985 – Fraser Island/ Sands of Time. ABC Enterprises: Sydney. (With Felicity Baverstock).
 1987 – The Watchers of Dar. Lilyfield Publishers, Australia. (With Nicholas Brash).
 1988 – Densey Clyne's Wildlife of Australia. Reed.
 1990 – How to Attract Butterflies to Your Garden. Reed Books: Balgowlah.
 1992 – Cicada Sing-Song. (Small Worlds). Allen & Unwin.
 1993 – Catch Me If You Can! Allen & Unwin.
 1994 – Flutter By, Butterfly. Allen & Unwin.
 1994 – Growing Roses. Kangaroo Press. (With Valerie Swane).
 1995 – Spotlight on Spiders. (Small Worlds). Allen & Unwin.
 1995 – It's a Frog's Life! (Small Worlds). Allen & Unwin.
 1998 – Plants of Prey. (Nature Close-Ups). Gareth Stevens Publishing.
 1998 – The Best of Wildlife in the Suburbs. OUP: Melbourne.
 2001 – Australian Rainforests. New Holland, Australia.
 1999 – Densey Clyne's Wildlife of Australia Pub. New Holland
 2007 – Densey Clyne's Wildlife of Australia (new edn) New Holland
 2009– "The Secret Lives of Caterpillars" Pub. New Holland
 2010 – "All About Ants" Pub. New Holland
 2011 – "Attracting Butterflies to your Garden" Pub. New Holland
 2018 – "My Encounters with Minibeasts" Pub. New Holland

Filmography 
Densey Clyne was involved as researcher, writer, narrator and/or adviser in the following productions, in partnership with cinematographer Jim Frazier:      
 1971 – "The Australian Ark" (Shell's Australia). Clyne was asked by producers Robert Raymond and Vincent Serventy to film her garden insects in macro, as part of a TV series on Australia's natural heritage. She approached Jim Frazier to join her in the venture; his first attempt at cinematography, based on her research into insect behaviour, was so successful that the team was commissioned to complete one entire programme for the series. This was the start of a 28-year filming partnership between Clyne and Frazier.
 1975 – "Garden Jungle" and "Aliens Among Us", two 50-minute documentaries researched and written by Clyne and filmed by Frazier, about the insects and spiders in her garden. These were sold first in Australia to the national 0–10 TV network and subsequently to the BBC in Britain and to networks in Germany, Holland, USA ("Garden Jungle"), Japan and Middle Eastern countries. Awards included the Australian Television Society's 'Golden Penguin'.
 Short (20-minute) educational documentaries:
 1975 – "Now You See Me Now You Don't"
 1975 – "Come Into My Parlour"
 1977 – "Every Care But No Responsibility"
 1977 – "Blueprint for Survival"
 1978 – "Butterfly Farming in Papua New Guinea", 10-minute film made for the ABC's 'Weekend Magazine', researched and scripted by Densey Clyne
 1979 – "Life on Earth"
 1983 – "The Living Planet". Clyne and Frazier were commissioned by the BBC as one of several filming teams to contribute to three of the BBC's world-renowned television series by Sir David Attenborough. They filmed sequences for these series in Borneo, Penang, West Sumatra and California, and were responsible for advising, researching and filming a number of Australian subjects, notably invertebrate animals.
 1979 – "Encounter Underground". Produced by BBC/ABC, a documentary about bulldog ants
 1980 – "Gippsland". Series of four half-hour documentaries by the ABC about the natural history of the Gippsland region in the state of Victoria.
 1982 – "Lady of the Spiders". Produced by BBC/ABC, a film about Dr Barbara Main and her trapdoor spider studies in Western Australia.
 1982 – "Funnelweb". Produced by Forest Homes Films, a documentary about the search for an antivenin to funnel-web spider venom.
 1983 – "Thrill of the Chase". Produced by the ABC, a film about Densey Clyne and Jim Frazier.
 1983 – "Kinchega National Park". Produced by the ABC.
 1984 – "Desire of the Moth". Conceived and written by Densey Clyne, and filmed by Jim Frazier, a one-hour documentary about the lives of moths produced by the BBC Natural History Unit, Bristol, England.
 1985 – "Frazer Island – The Sands of Time". Produced by Yowie Films, Sydney; written by Densey Clyne and filmed by Jim Frazier, a one-hour TV documentary about the biggest sand island in the world, off the coast of Queensland
 1985-6 – "The Nature of Australia". Produced by the ABC for Australia's bicentennial year, a series of six one-hour documentaries for TV about the evolution of Australia's fauna.
 1986 – "To Be a Butterfly" (Gold Camera Award, USA). Conceived, written and directed by Densey Clyne and filmed by Jim Frazier in Australia, a one-hour documentary about the lives of tropical butterflies, produced by Oxford Scientific Films for Anglia TV.
 1986 – "Sounds Like Australia". Produced by Film Australia, directed by Jamie Robertson, a documentary about two musicians inspired to compose music by the sounds of nature. Wildlife sequences filmed, and sound recorded, by Mantis. (Won Golden Tripod Award)
 1988–9 – "The Trials of Life". Wildlife sequences filmed over three years for David Attenborough's award-winning 13-part BBC TV series; consultations with BBC on Australian subjects researched and filmed by Mantis.
 1991–2 – "Webs of Intrigue" (one-hour documentary about spiders). This documentary, filmed by Jim Frazier, is an update of the original "Aliens Among Us", conceived, researched, written and presented by Densey Clyne. The new film won a number of cinematography, educational and other awards, including an Emmy in the USA, a Panda at Wildscreen in the UK, and the Japan Wildlife Festival Grand Award in 1995. Produced by Roger Whittaker Productions.
 1996–7 – "The Amazing World of Minibeasts". One-hour documentary about the lives of insects and others, conceived, researched, written and presented by Densey Clyne and filmed by Jim Frazier. Produced and directed by Silvergrass Productions

References

External links 

Australian naturalists
Australian nature writers
Australian photographers
Australian documentary filmmakers
Australian entomologists
1922 births
2019 deaths
Australian women artists
People from Risca
British emigrants to Australia
People from the Mid North Coast
Australian women in World War II
Women documentary filmmakers
Australian Army personnel of World War II
Australian Army officers